Landrethun-lès-Ardres (literally Landrethun near Ardres) is a commune in the Pas-de-Calais department in the Hauts-de-France region of France.

Geography
A village situated 14 miles (23 km) northwest of Saint-Omer, on the D227 road.

Population

Places of interest
 The church of St. Martin, dating from the nineteenth century.

See also
Communes of the Pas-de-Calais department

References

External links

 Official Regional Tourist Office website

Landrethunlesardres